City of Lompoc Transit, known as COLT, is primary provider of mass transportation in Lompoc, Mission Hills, and Vandenberg Village, California. Six local routes are provided, plus one interurban line to Solvang, California and a twice-weekly shuttle to Santa Barbara.

Routes
1 — Mission Plaza to Lompoc Museum
2 — Mission Plaza to Olive Ave
3 — Mission Plaza to County Office Building
4 — Mission Plaza to Mission Hills/Vanderberg Village
5 — Mission Plaza to Casa Serena
Wine County Express — Mission Plaza to Buellton/Solvang
Santa Barbara Shuttle - Mission Plaza to Santa Barbara

References

Bus transportation in California
Public transportation in Santa Barbara County, California
Lompoc, California
Solvang, California
RATP Group